Nicholas Carl Sorensen (born July 31, 1978) is an American football coach and former safety who is a defensive assistant for the San Francisco 49ers. He played college football at Virginia Tech and signed with the Miami Dolphins as an undrafted free agent in 2001.

High school years
Sorensen lived in Vienna, Virginia and attended George C. Marshall High School.  He lettered three seasons, each, in football, basketball, and baseball. He threw for 1,925 yards and 23 touchdowns during his football career and rushed for 604 yards and 10 touchdowns.  He was inducted into the George C. Marshall Athletic Hall of Fame, which includes other NFL players Keith Lyle and Mike McCrary.

College career
Sorensen was a four-year letterman for the Virginia Tech Hokies and started at safety and linebacker during his final two seasons where he posted 117 tackles, ten tackles for losses, four sacks and an interception.  He began his college career as a quarterback, and completed 42 of 80 passes for 446 yards with four touchdowns and nine interceptions.  At 19 years, 3 months of age, Sorensen made a mid-season start replacing the injured Al Clark against UAB going making 11 of 21 passes including a 22-yard touchdown pass to Marcus Gildersleeve.  Sorensen was named Virginia Tech's Player of the Game in the 1998 Gator Bowl loss to North Carolina.  In 1999, Sorensen moved from quarterback to defense, turning over the quarterback duties to the team's talented freshman, Michael Vick. That year Vick took the Hokies to a national championship game and a No. 2 national ranking. Sorensen finished fourth on the team with 70 tackles, one less than future Brown Ben Taylor.  He graduated from Virginia Tech with a degree in marketing.

Professional career
Sorensen was signed by the Miami Dolphins as an undrafted rookie free agent on April 27, 2001, but was waived before the season started. He joined the St. Louis Rams, also in 2001, where he played for two seasons—including the Rams' appearance in Super Bowl XXXVI.

Following that Super Bowl season, the Rams cut Sorensen, who was then picked up by the Jacksonville Jaguars.  In Jacksonville, Sorensen played four seasons in the defensive backfield and as a standout on special teams.  All four years he was the special teams captain. In 2006, Sorensen suffered a significant injury, and the Jaguars cut him prior to the start of the 2007 season.

On October 24, 2007, he signed with the Cleveland Browns, and on February 29, 2008, the first day of free agency, he re-signed with the Browns.

On October 26, 2008, Sorensen returned to Jacksonville for the first time after being cut by Jaguars head coach Jack Del Rio in August 2007. Sorensen broke up the final play of the game (a pass from David Garrard to Matt Jones) with 13 seconds left in the game.  The Browns won the game 23–17 thanks to Sorensen's effort.

As of the end of the 2009 season, Sorensen had not missed any of the 41 games since joining the Browns, but had also not made a start. Going into the 2010 season, Sorensen was scheduled to earn $774,340 and was third on the Browns' depth chart behind rookies T. J. Ward and Larry Asante. The presence of the newly drafted rookies meant that Sorensen faced being cut after training camp. He was not and went on to primarily contribute on special teams.

On August 28, 2010, he was carted off the field with a possible neck injury during an exhibition game versus the Detroit Lions.  His contract expired at the conclusion of the 2010 season, and he was not signed in free agency. 

During the 2012 season, Sorensen was working as an analyst for WKYC channel 3 in Cleveland (NBC) on the station's Browns Tonight post-game show.

Coaching career

Seahawks
From 2013 to 2020, Sorensen was a coach on the Seattle Seahawks staff, under head coach Pete Carroll. He served as a special teams assistant for his first three seasons. Sorenson won his first Super Bowl title when the Seahawks defeated the Denver Broncos in Super Bowl XLVIII. In 2016 he deserved as assistant defensive backs coach, and beginning in 2017, Sorensen served as coach of the Seahawks' secondary, formerly known as the Legion of Boom.

Jaguars
In June of 2021, the Jacksonville Jaguars announced that they had hired Sorensen as their special teams coordinator. He was hired to replace former Seahawks special teams coordinator Brian Schneider, who left the organization after a brief tenure due to personal reasons.

49ers
In 2022 he became a defensive assistant for San Francisco

Family
On February 27, 2010, Sorensen wed Danielle Berry.

Sorensen's cousin, James Augustine, played forward/center in the National Basketball Association.  Sorensen's father, Dick, played football for the Miami Hurricanes from 1965-1969.  Sorensen and his brother, Derek, are charter members of the Old Courthouse Club, a small social club with limited membership in the Vienna, Virginia area.

References

External links
Virginia Tech bio

1978 births
Living people
People from Winter Haven, Florida
American football safeties
American football quarterbacks
Virginia Tech Hokies football players
Miami Dolphins players
St. Louis Rams players
Jacksonville Jaguars players
Jacksonville Jaguars coaches
Cleveland Browns players
Seattle Seahawks coaches
Sportspeople from Fairfax County, Virginia
People from Vienna, Virginia
Players of American football from Virginia
San Francisco 49ers coaches